Motozane (written:  or ) is a masculine Japanese given name. Notable people with the name include:

, Japanese samurai
, Japanese poet
, Japanese kugyō

Japanese masculine given names